Augusto Ferrero (born 3 February 1944) is a Peruvian former freestyle and backstroke swimmer. He competed in two events at the 1964 Summer Olympics.

References

External links
 

1944 births
Living people
Peruvian male backstroke swimmers
Peruvian male freestyle swimmers
Olympic swimmers of Peru
Swimmers at the 1964 Summer Olympics
Place of birth missing (living people)
20th-century Peruvian people